JoAnne Dorothy Good (born 15 January 1955) is a British radio presenter, television presenter, broadcast journalist and actress.

Career

Actress
As an actress, she is best known for her role as Carole Sands in the ITV soap Crossroads from 1981 to 1984. She played a schoolgirl in the 1978 cult British horror film Killer's Moon, and filmed an interview for the 2008 DVD release. She also appeared in the all-star black comedy film Eat the Rich in 1987 and in the Only Fools and Horses episode "Go West Young Man" in 1981. She provided the voices of Lillie Lightship, Sally Seaplane and Pearl in Tugs, a show created by Robert D. Cardona, David Mitton and the original model makers of Thomas the Tank Engine & Friends. On stage she has played the title role in Educating Rita, co-starring with Norman Bowler, and for several years in the 1990s worked as part of Derek Nimmo's touring company, performing all over the world.  She played several parts in The Bill, most recently in 2008, and was an extra in the Sex and the City film.

Radio and TV presenter
Good started as a radio presenter on BBC Southern Counties Radio in Brighton and occasionally did reports for television programme BBC South Today. Good joined BBC London 94.9 in October 2003 and has remained there since. She originally presented the Overnight slot, followed by the Breakfast Show which she presented from 2005 till 2010 when she was asked to present her own late show titled The Late Show with Joanne Good. Good presented the show for just under three years.

In 2007 Good auditioned unsuccessfully for a role on Loose Women and in 2010 she was considered as a replacement for Christine Bleakley on The One Show, the BBC's live evening televised magazine show on BBC One.

In addition to her radio work, Good has also been featured in Sky One show A Different Breed along with friend and fellow dog fanatic Anna Webb. The show showed Jo and Anna at dog events and featured extracts from her Late Night show and its 'Barking at the Moon' segment which was broadcast every Thursday night from 10:00 pm to midnight.

In November 2012 Jo began presenting the afternoon slot, 3:00 pm till 5:00 pm (later extended to 1:30 pm to 5:00 pm), on BBC London 94.9 and presents the late show every New Year's Eve on the same station, and she returned to the late show slot on 13 September 2021.

Jo presents regular reports for the BBC London current affairs television programme Inside Out, shown on BBC1 weekly whilst occasionally making reports for the South East edition show from 1:30 pm to 5:00 pm (from January 2016).  She also works a regular columnist and magazine and newspaper writer.

Good sat in for Alex Lester on BBC Radio 2 during August 2014 and has appeared on The Alan Titchmarsh Show as a pet expert.

She has a weekly video blog Middle aged minx and has written a book called Barking Blondes, which was released in 2013. The book is a memoir of her broadcasting years and her love of her dog.

Personal life
Good's family emigrated to Australia when she was four, and returned when she was twelve.

She married actor Richard Piper in 1978, and they were together for four years. After her divorce from Piper, Good was in a relationship with her Crossroads co-star David Moran. Her partner and fellow BBC London 94.9 presenter Big George died in May 2011.

Her friends include Julie Burchill and Julian Clary.

Good has been critical of how women in radio continue to play subservient roles to men.

Filmography

Film

Television

Animation

References

External links
 Jo Good (BBC Radio London)
 
 Crossroads Appreciation Society: JoAnne Good interview

Actresses from London
English radio presenters
English television presenters
Living people
1955 births